138th meridian may refer to:

138th  meridian east, a line of longitude east of the Greenwich Meridian
138th meridian west, a line of longitude west of the Greenwich Meridian